Simret Sultan Ghebermichael (born 20 July 1984) is an Eritrean long-distance runner who specializes in the 5000 metres and cross-country running. She was born in Mirara. She won the Cross de Atapuerca competition in Spain in 2007. She competed in the 2008 Summer Olympics in Beijing, China, and was the flag-bearer for her nation during the opening ceremonies of those games.

It was reported in February 2009 that Simret has defected and claimed asylum in the UK.

Achievements

Personal bests
1500 metres - 4:25.0 min (2001)
3000 metres - 9:42.28 min (2004)
5000 metres - 15:18.69 min (2005)
10,000 metres - 34:00.47 min (2002)

External links

References

1984 births
Living people
Eritrean female long-distance runners
Olympic athletes of Eritrea
Athletes (track and field) at the 2008 Summer Olympics
Athletes (track and field) at the 2007 All-Africa Games
African Games competitors for Eritrea